Pier 54 may refer to the following:
 Pier 54, New York, a pier in New York, currently in ruins, but once used by the Cunard Line.
 Pier 54, Seattle, a pier in Seattle, built in 1900, still in use as of 2011.